Wu Di is a Chinese cinematographer and one-time film director, known for his collaborations with Sixth Generation director, Wang Xiaoshuai. The director of photography for over ten films (all with mainland directors), Wu Di also wrote and directed a feature of his own, 1995's Goldfish.

Filmography

As cinematographer

As director

External links
 
 

Chinese cinematographers
Chinese film directors
Year of birth missing (living people)
Living people